Xichan Temple is a Buddhist temple located on the slope of Mount Yi, in Gulou District, Fuzhou, Fujian.

History

Tang dynasty
The original temple dates back to 867, in the reign of Emperor Yizong (860–874) of Tang dynasty (618–907).

Five Dynasties and Ten Kingdoms
In 933, under the Five Dynasties and Ten Kingdoms (907–960), the temple was renamed "Changqing Temple".

Song dynasty
The temple underwent two renovations in the Song dynasty (960–1279), respectively in the ruling of Emperor Renzong (1023–1063) and in the reign of Emperor Lizong (1225–1264).

Yuan dynasty
In 1349 in the Mongolian-ruling Yuan dynasty (1271–1368), monks refurbished and redecorated the temple.

Ming dynasty
In 1437, in the 2nd year of Zhengtong period (1436–1449) in the Ming dynasty (1368–1644), monk Dingxin supervised the reconstruction of Xichan Temple.

In 1637, in the 10th year of Chongzhen era (1628–1644) of the late Ming dynasty, monk Mingliang renovated the temple.

Qing dynasty
In the reign of Guangxu Emperor (1875–1908) of the Qing dynasty (1644–1911), master Weimiao headed the temple, he raised funds to restore it. Mahavira Hall, Dharma Hall and Hall of Four Heavenly Kings were gradually rebuilt.

Republic of China
In 1937, after the Marco Polo Bridge Incident, the Second Sino-Japanese War broke out. Xichan Temple was devastated by war between the Nationalists and the Imperial Japanese Army.

People's Republic of China
After the establishment of the Communist State in 1949, local government restored and redecorated the temple.

In 1966, Mao Zedong launched the ten-year Cultural Revolution, the Red Guards had attacked the temple, volumes of sutras, historical documents, statues of Buddha, and other works of art were either removed, damaged or destroyed in the massive movement.

After the 3rd Plenary Session of the 11th Central Committee of the Chinese Communist Party, according to the national policy of free religious belief, Xichan Temple was officially reopened to the public in 1979.

Xichan Temple has been inscribed as a National Key Buddhist Temple in Han Chinese Area by the State Council of China in 1983.

References

Buddhist temples in Fuzhou
Buildings and structures in Fuzhou
Tourist attractions in Fuzhou
20th-century establishments in China
20th-century Buddhist temples
Major National Historical and Cultural Sites in Fujian